Denní Telegraf was a newspaper based in the Czech Republic. It was published from 1994 to 1997. It served as a newspaper of the Civic Democratic Party. It was published by Nový Telegraf, s.r.o.

History
Denní Telegraf was founded in 1994 as a newspaper of the Civic Democratic Party. It has never been successful and Denní Telegraf ceased to exist in 1997.

See also
 List of newspapers in the Czech Republic

References

Daily newspapers published in the Czech Republic
Czech-language newspapers
Publications established in 1994
Newspapers published in Prague
Civic Democratic Party (Czech Republic)
Defunct newspapers published in the Czech Republic
Political newspapers